Herbert Abingdon Draper Compton (1770 – 14 January 1846) was Chief Justice of the Supreme Court of Bombay, and Advocate-General of Madras and Calcutta.

Early life
Draper Compton was the only son of Walter Abingdon Compton of Gloucestershire. He joined the British Royal Army and served with his regiment in British India. After returning to England he spent some time in writing for the newspapers, especially for the Pilot, and studied law. On 22 November 1808, he was called to the bar at Lincoln's Inn

Career
Draper Compton came in India in 1719 and joined the bar at Fort St. George. In 1822, he was appointed to the posts of Advocate-general at Madras and Calcutta High Court. In 1831 he became the Chief Justice of Bombay and was knighted. After retirement, he returned to England and died at his house in Hyde Park Gardens in 1846.

References

1770 births
1846 deaths
Chief Justices of the Bombay High Court
British India judges
Knights Bachelor
Advocates General for Tamil Nadu
Members of Lincoln's Inn
18th-century British judges